Nikolskoye is a rural locality (a selo) and the administrative centre of Nikolsky Selsoviet, Krasnokamsky District, Bashkortostan, Russia. The population was 496 as of 2010. There are 9 streets.

Geography 
Nikolskoye is located 30 km northeast of Nikolo-Beryozovka (the district's administrative centre) by road. Biktimirovo is the nearest rural locality.

References 

Rural localities in Krasnokamsky District